Resetnikia is a genus of flowering plants belonging to the family Brassicaceae.

Its native range is Northwestern Balkan Peninsula.

Species:
 Resetnikia triquetra (DC.) Španiel, Al-Shehbaz, D.A.German & Marhold

References

Brassicaceae
Brassicaceae genera